The FIBA Africa Championship 1974 was hosted by the Central African Republic from April 5 to April 15, 1974.  The games were played in Bangui.  Central African Republic won the tournament, its first African Championship, by beating Senegal in the final.  Central African Republic qualified for the 1974 FIBA World Championship by winning the tournament.

Competing Nations
The following national teams competed:

Preliminary rounds

Group A

Day 1

Day 2

Day 3

Day 4

Day 5

Group B

Day 1

Day 2

Day 3

Day 4

Day 5

Knockout stage

Classification Stage

Final standings

 qualified for the 1974 FIBA World Championship.

Awards

External links
 FIBA Archive

1974 in African basketball
AfroBasket
B
International sports competitions hosted by the Central African Republic
April 1974 sports events in Africa